Tetracotyle is a genus of flatworms belonging to the family Strigeidae.

The species of this genus are found in Europe and Northern America.

Species:
 Tetracotyle bicolandiae Tubangui, 1933 
 Tetracotyle colubri Linstow, 1877

References

Platyhelminthes